Patrick Henry Drewry (May 24, 1875 – December 21, 1947) was a Virginia lawyer and Democratic politician who served in the United States House of Representatives and state senate.

Early life and education

Born in Petersburg, Virginia, as one of the three surviving sons of Dr. Emmett Arrington Drewry (1838–1891) and his second wife, the former Altazera Laughton of Petersburg. His maternal grandfather was Patrick Henry Booth Sr. of Surry County, Virginia. His paternal grandfather, James Drewry (1808–1878) was a major landowner in Southampton County, Virginia, and the town of Drewryville, Virginia was named for the family. His father had enlisted in the 9th Virginia Infantry as a surgeon shortly after graduating from medical school, but mostly served at Poplar Lawn hospital in Petersburg, then was assigned to North Carolina late in the war. His cousin, Dr. William Francis Drewry (1860–1934) was active in Petersburg politics and became the city's mayor, and later Superintendent of the nearby Central State Hospital, whose budget the state senator helped supervise. During his son's youth, Dr. Emmett Drewry had helped to found the Medical Society of Virginia in Richmond, but mostly practiced in Southampton County.

Patrick Drewry attended several local public schools, including Petersburg High School, and McCabe's University School. He then pursued studies at Randolph-Macon College, in Ashland, Virginia, and graduated in 1896. He received an honorary LLD degree from his alma mater in 1946. Following college, Drewry decided to study law at the University of Virginia Law School, and received a degree.

In 1906, Drewry married Mary Elizabeth Metcalf, a judge's daughter, in Palmyra, Missouri. They had three sons.

Career

After being admitted to the bar in 1901, Drewry began legal practice in Petersburg. He was active in the Washington Street Methodist Church (and wrote a history of it), as well as the Sons of Confederate Veterans (became Commander of the A.P. Hill Camp, i.e. Petersburg chapter). Drewry also was director of the Petersburg Savings and American Trust Co.

Political career
A member of the Martin Organization, which evolved into the Byrd Organization, Drewry won his first election in 1911, to the Senate of Virginia, where he replaced Spanish–American War veteran Charles T. Lassiter (brother of Major General William Lassiter and the recently deceased Congressman Francis Rives Lassiter. Drewry represented the city of Petersburg and neighboring Dinwiddie County, and won re-election, thus serving (part-time) from 1912 until 1920. An advocate for medical and charitable causes, Drewry also sponsored the state's vital statistics bill. Drewry was also a delegate to the Democratic State conventions in 1912, 1916, 1920, and 1924. In 1916, he served as delegate to the Democratic National Convention. A fiscal conservative, Drewry became chairman of the Economy and Efficiency Commission of Virginia in 1916–1918. He also accepted appointments as chairman of the State auditing committee (1916 to 1920), and as chairman of the State advisory board (1919).

Drewry won election as a Democrat to the Sixty-sixth Congress to fill the vacancy caused by the death of Walter A. Watson. He won reelection to the Sixty-seventh and thirteen succeeding Congresses. Thus Drewry served from April 27, 1920, until his death. He also served as member of the Board of Visitors to the United States Naval Academy at Annapolis in 1925 and several additional times, as ranking member of the House Naval Affairs Committee. Drewry was a member of the Democratic National Congressional Committee from 1923 to 1927, and chairman of the Democratic National Committee in 1935.

Death and legacy

Drewry died in Petersburg, Virginia on December 21, 1947. Unlike his father, who had been interred in the family graveyard in Drewryville, but like his brothers who practiced in Norfolk and Martinsville and were interred in those locations, Congressman Drewry was interred in Petersburg's historic Blandford Cemetery.

Elections
 1920; Elected to the U.S. House of Representatives unopposed in a special election, and he won re-election with 92.6% of the vote in the general election, defeating Republican F.L. Mason
 1922; Re-elected with 86.2% of the vote, defeating Republican Herbert Rogers and Independent W.H. Gill
 1924; Re-elected unopposed
 1926; Re-elected unopposed
 1928; Re-elected unopposed
 1930; Re-elected unopposed
 1932; Re-elected as part of the Democratic ticket for Virginia's at-large congressional district; he won 8.2% in a 24-way race
 1934; Re-elected with 94.4% of the vote, defeating Socialist Dan Killinger and Independent Mary F. Leslie
 1936; Re-elected with 90.4% of the vote, defeating Republican John Martin and Socialist Killinger
 1938; Re-elected unopposed
 1940; Re-elected with 96.0% of the vote, defeating Socialist Cyrus Hotchkiss
 1942; Re-elected unopposed
 1944; Re-elected unopposed
 1946; Re-elected with 87.1% of the vote, defeating Republican Andrew S. Condrey

See also
 List of United States Congress members who died in office (1900–49)

References

External links
 
 

1875 births
1947 deaths
Virginia lawyers
Democratic Party Virginia state senators
University of Virginia School of Law alumni
Randolph–Macon College alumni
20th-century American lawyers
20th-century American politicians
Democratic Party members of the United States House of Representatives from Virginia
Politicians from Petersburg, Virginia
Burials at Blandford Cemetery